John E. Thomas (November 27, 1829 – April 14, 1910) was a lawyer, public administrator, and politician.  He was a member of the Wisconsin State Assembly and the Wisconsin State Senate.

Early life
Thomas was born in Rensselaer County, New York. At age four, his family relocated to Livingston County, then to Genesee County, New York, where he gained his common school education. The family's wealth was decimated by the Panic of 1837 and, at age 16, Thomas moved to Lockport, took a job as a merchant, and continued his studies.

He moved to Sheboygan Falls, Wisconsin, in 1849, where he married his wife, Clara A. W. Cole.  He continued his business pursuits until 1856, when he began studying law. He was admitted to the bar in 1858 and began practicing law.  He later became President of the Dairyman's Bank and for some time was owner and editor of the Sheboygan County News.

Career
He was elected to represent Sheboygan Falls and northeastern Sheboygan County in the Wisconsin Assembly for the 1862 session.  The next year, he was elected to represent all of Sheboygan County for 1863 and 1864 in the Wisconsin Senate. He was a Democrat.

In the Senate, he was Chair of the Select Committee to consider liability and compensation for victims of the so-called "Ozaukee Riot," and recommended in favor of recognizing the legality and paying the claimants from the state treasury (1863 Wisconsin Act 211). He also authored a bill to appropriate funding to the Governor and empower him to locate veterans at various hospitals around the country who had been wounded in the ongoing Civil War, and attempt to return them to Wisconsin to recuperate (1863 Wisconsin Act 196).

After leaving office, he conducted a successful law practice in Sheboygan County.  He served on the County Board, was a member of the Board of Regents of the Normal School for six years, was a member of the local school board, and was town and county superintendent of schools.  He was Secretary of the County Agricultural Society and Horticulture Society, and was Village President. He was also a prominent Mason.

Third-party activity 
In 1880, he was the Greenback Party nominee for Wisconsin's 5th congressional district, receiving 1,188 votes to 16,984 for Democratic incumbent Edward S. Bragg and 14,753 for Republican Elihu Colman. He was again the nominee in 1882, receiving 764 votes to 12,933 for Democrat Joseph Rankin; 6,108 for Republican Levi Howland and 813 for Prohibitionist R. L. Wing.

In 1886, Thomas was the candidate of the Union Labor party, also called the "People's Party", for Attorney General of Wisconsin. He won 21,740 votes to 131,358 votes for Democrat Charles Estabrook; 115,949 for Democrat George W. Bird, and 17,247 votes for Prohibitionist E. W. Chafin. In 1888, he was their original nominee for Railroad Commissioner, but in the wake of a dispute over electoral fusion, he apparently withdrew his candidacy, as another candidate was on the ballot in November.

Later years 
Thomas died April 14, 1910 at St. Nicholas Hospital in Sheboygan, after a long illness. By that time, he was the oldest member of the Sheboygan legal profession.

References

People from Rensselaer County, New York
People from Sheboygan Falls, Wisconsin
Democratic Party Wisconsin state senators
Democratic Party members of the Wisconsin State Assembly
Wisconsin Greenbacks
1829 births
1910 deaths
County supervisors in Wisconsin
19th-century American lawyers
Wisconsin lawyers
Wisconsin Laborites
American Freemasons
School superintendents in Wisconsin
School board members in Wisconsin
19th-century American politicians
20th-century American lawyers